The second season of the American drama television series La Reina del Sur was announced by Telemundo on 11 May 2017. The season based on the original work of Arturo Pérez-Reverte is adapted for television by Roberto Stopello. Filming officially began in April 2018 in Tuscany, Italy. The season premiered on 22 April 2019 and ended on 29 July 2019.

Plot 
The season revolves around Teresa Mendoza nine years after the events of the first season. Hidden from the rest of the world, Teresa now lives an idyllic existence in Italian Tuscany, but the kidnapping of her daughter forces her to reintroduce herself into the underworld of drug trafficking and once again confront her old enemies and the past she tried to leave behind.

Production 
The series initially filmed in Italy, but much of the production took place in Colombia, because Kate del Castillo could not return to Mexico. The series also filmed in places such as Moscow, Russia, Bucharest, Romania, Massa Marittima, and Malaga, Spain. In addition to the return of Del Castillo, Alejandro Calva and Eduardo Velasco, new actors joined the series including as Aitor Luna, Jesús Castro, and Eduardo Yáñez. According to Stopello, the season begins eight years after Teresa's disappearance. The cast was revealed on 29 November 2018.

The title of the first episode "El regreso de la Reina" was revealed by Del Castillo through her Instagram account. A total of 60 episodes have been confirmed for this season.

Cast 
 Kate del Castillo as Teresa Mendoza
 Raoul Bova as Francesco Belmondo
 Paola Núñez as Manuela
 Mark Tacher as Alejandro Alcalá
 Flavio Medina as Zurdo Villa
 Luisa Gavasa as Cayetana Segovia
 Antonio Gil as Oleg Yosikov
 Alejandro Calva as César Güemes "Batman"
 Kika Edgar as Genoveva Alcalá
 Lincoln Palomeque as Faustino Sánchez Godoy
 Patricia Reyes Spíndola as Carmen Martínez
 Carmen Flores Sandoval as Charo
 Emannuel Orenday as Danilo Márquez
 Alejandro Speitzer as Ray Dávila
 Christian Tappan as Willy Rangel
 Tiago Correa as Jonathan Peres
 Cuca Escribano as Sheila
 Carmen Navarro as Marcela / La Conejo
 Miguel Ángel Blanco as Siso Pernas
 Eduardo Velasco as Coronel Abdelkader Chaib
 Sara Vidorreta as Rocío Aljarafe
 Agata Clares as Paloma Aljarafe
 Juan José Arjona as Pablo Flores
 Abdelali el Aziz as Ahmed
 Isabella Sierra as Sofía Dantes
 Humberto Zurita as Epifanio Vargas
 Jesús Castro as Jesús
 Pol Monen as Juan
 Eduardo Yáñez as Antonio Alcalá
 Aitor Luna as Pedro
 Eduardo Santamarina as Mariano Bravo
 Eric Roberts as Erick Sheldon
 María Camila Giraldo as Jimena Montes
 Vera Mercado as Virginia Vargas
 Norma Angélica as Morgana
 Eduardo Pérez as Sergio
 Dimitry Anisimov as Anton
 Aroha Hafez as Triana
 Anna Ciocchetti as Marietta Lancaster
 Roberto Abraham Wohlmuth as Lencho

Episodes

Special

References 

2019 American television seasons